Marija Ivandekić (born 25 August 1925) was a Yugoslav gymnast. She competed in seven events at the 1952 Summer Olympics.

References

External links
 

1925 births
Year of death missing
Yugoslav female artistic gymnasts
Olympic gymnasts of Yugoslavia
Gymnasts at the 1952 Summer Olympics
Place of birth missing